John Synadenos can refer to:

 John Synadenos (megas stratopedarches) (fl. 1277–1310/28), Byzantine nobleman and general
 John Synadenos (megas konostaulos) (fl. 1320s), son of the above, Byzantine nobleman and general